The 2008–09 Highland Football League was won by Cove Rangers. Fort William finished bottom with the lowest points tally in the history of the league (1 point).

Table

Results

References

Highland Football League seasons
5
Scottish